Sarah Bishop (previously Falkland) is a journalist on British television working as a reporter and newsreader on BBC Midlands Today for the West Midlands Region.

Career
Before joining Midlands Today, she worked as Sarah Falkland for the BBC's Hereford and Worcester, Coventry and Warwickshire and WM local radio stations.

Currently, Sarah Bishop reports frequently from the Warwickshire and Worcestershire areas, as well as presenting various short bulletins and regularly covering as a main presenter on the flagship 6:30pm weekday programme. Up until December 2009, she was also one of two presenters for the weekly Politics Show opt-out in the West Midlands. Sarah has recently been seen as a reporter on BBC Breakfast.

Charitable work
As Sarah Falkland, she became an ambassador for the charity CORD.

Personal life
Bishop currently lives in Warwickshire, where she enjoys road cycling and horse racing.

References

External links
 CORD

British television presenters
Year of birth missing (living people)
Living people
BBC newsreaders and journalists
People from Leamington Spa